In mathematics, and specifically differential geometry, a density is a spatially varying quantity on a differentiable manifold that can be integrated in an intrinsic manner. Abstractly, a density is a section of a certain line bundle, called the density bundle. An element of the density bundle at x is a function  that assigns a volume for the parallelotope spanned by the n given tangent vectors at x.

From the operational point of view, a density is a collection of functions on coordinate charts which become multiplied by the absolute value of the Jacobian determinant in the change of coordinates. Densities can be generalized into s-densities, whose coordinate representations become multiplied by the s-th power of the absolute value of the jacobian determinant. On an oriented manifold, 1-densities can be canonically identified with the n-forms on M. On non-orientable manifolds this identification cannot be made, since the density bundle is the tensor product of the orientation bundle of M and the n-th exterior product bundle of TM (see pseudotensor).

Motivation (densities in vector spaces) 

In general, there does not exist a natural concept of a "volume" for a parallelotope generated by vectors  in a n-dimensional vector space V. However, if one wishes to define a function  that assigns a volume for any such parallelotope, it should satisfy the following properties:

 If any linear combination of the vectors v1, ..., vj−1, vj+1, ..., vn is added to the vector vj, the volume should stay invariant.

These conditions are equivalent to the statement that μ is given by a translation-invariant measure on V, and they can be rephrased as

Any such mapping  is called a density on the vector space V. Note that if (v1, ..., vn) is any basis for V, then fixing μ(v1, ..., vn) will fix μ entirely; it follows that the set Vol(V) of all densities on V forms a one-dimensional vector space. Any n-form ω on V defines a density  on V by

Orientations on a vector space

The set Or(V) of all functions  that satisfy

forms a one-dimensional vector space, and an orientation on V is one of the two elements  such that  for any linearly independent . Any non-zero n-form ω on V defines an orientation  such that

and vice versa, any  and any density  define an n-form ω on V by

In terms of tensor product spaces,

s-densities on a vector space

The s-densities on V are functions  such that

Just like densities, s-densities form a one-dimensional vector space Vols(V), and any n-form ω on V defines an s-density |ω|s on V by

In terms of tensor product spaces this fact can be stated as

Definition

Formally, the s-density bundle Vols(M) of a differentiable manifold M is obtained by an associated bundle construction, intertwining the one-dimensional group representation

of the general linear group with the frame bundle of M.

The resulting line bundle is known as the bundle of s-densities, and is denoted by

A 1-density is also referred to simply as a density.

More generally, the associated bundle construction also allows densities to be constructed from any vector bundle E on M.

In detail, if (Uα,φα) is an atlas of coordinate charts on M, then there is associated a local trivialization of 

subordinate to the open cover Uα such that the associated GL(1)-cocycle satisfies

Integration 

Densities play a significant role in the theory of integration on manifolds. Indeed, the definition of a density is motivated by how a measure dx changes under a change of coordinates .

Given a 1-density ƒ supported in a coordinate chart Uα, the integral is defined by

where the latter integral is with respect to the Lebesgue measure on Rn.  The transformation law for 1-densities together with the Jacobian change of variables ensures compatibility on the overlaps of different coordinate charts, and so the integral of a general compactly supported 1-density can be defined by a partition of unity argument.  Thus 1-densities are a generalization of the notion of a volume form that does not necessarily require the manifold to be oriented or even orientable.  One can more generally develop a general theory of Radon measures as distributional sections of  using the Riesz-Markov-Kakutani representation theorem.

The set of 1/p-densities such that  is a normed linear space whose completion  is called the intrinsic Lp space of M.

Conventions
In some areas, particularly conformal geometry, a different weighting convention is used: the bundle of s-densities is instead associated with the character

With this convention, for instance, one integrates n-densities (rather than 1-densities).  Also in these conventions, a conformal metric is identified with a tensor density of weight 2.

Properties
 Tensor densities are sections of the tensor product of a density bundle with a tensor bundle.

References

 .
 
 
 

Differential geometry
Manifolds
Lp spaces